The Giardino Botanico Alpino "Giangio Lorenzoni" is an alpine botanical garden located in Pian di Cansiglio, Boral del Giaz, Tambre d'Alpago, Province of Belluno, Veneto, Italy. It is open daily in the warmer months.

The garden was established in 1972 by the will of Professor Giovanni Giorgio Lorenzoni of the University of Padua, inaugurated in 1995, and expanded in recent years. It now contains over 700 plant species from the Massif Cansiglio-Cavallo including Gentiana symphyandra, Geranium argenteum, Menyanthes trifoliata, Potamogeton natans, Rudbeckia laciniata, and rare and medicinal alpine plants.

See also 
 List of botanical gardens in Italy

References 
 Riserva naturale orientata Pian di Landro Baldassare -  Il Giardino Botanico Alpino "G. Lorenzoni"
 Veneto Agricoltura description (Italian)
 Horti entry (Italian)
 BGCI entry
 L'Italia dei giardini, Touring Club Italiano, Touring Editore, 2005, page 60. .

Botanical gardens in Italy
Gardens in Veneto